The 1993 Texas Tech Red Raiders football team represented the Texas Tech University as a member of the Southwest Conference (SWC) during the 1993 NCAA Division I-A football season. Led by seventh-year head coach Spike Dykes, the Red Raiders compiled an overall record of 6–6 with a mark of 5–2 in conference play, tying for second place in the SWC. Texas Tech was invited to the John Hancock Bowl, where they lost to Oklahoma. The Red Raiders offense scored 419 points while the defense allowed 335 points.

Schedule

Roster

Team players drafted into the NFL

Awards and honors
Bam Morris, Doak Walker Award

References

Texas Tech
Texas Tech Red Raiders football seasons
Texas Tech Red Raiders football